Thurston High School is a public high school located in the Thurston area of Springfield, Oregon, United States.

Academics
In 2008, 80% of the school's seniors received a high school diploma. Of 338 students, 271 graduated, 30 dropped out, 11 received a modified diploma, and 26 were still in high school the following year.

Notable alumni
Colby Covington, professional Mixed Martial Artist, former UFC interim Welterweight Champion
Jodi Ann Paterson, 2000 Playboy Playmate of the Year
Dan Straily (born 1988), starting pitcher in the Philadelphia Phillies organization

Shooting

On May 21, 1998, the school became the scene of a shooting. Expelled student Kipland Kinkel opened fire with three guns and killed two students and injured 25 others. He was pinned down while he was reloading and restrained until police arrived and arrested him. Kinkel (who had also murdered his parents the previous night) was sentenced to 111 years in prison.

References

Further reading 
 Kracht, Shannon L. (2018). Thurston Union High--A History (PDF)—via Springfield History Museum

High schools in Lane County, Oregon
Springfield, Oregon
Public high schools in Oregon
1965 establishments in Oregon
Educational institutions established in 1965